Græsted station is a railway station serving the town of Græsted in North Zealand, Denmark.

Græsted station is located on the Gribskov Line from Hillerød to Gilleleje. The station was opened in 1880 with the opening of the Hillerød-Græsted section of the Gribskov Line. The train services are operated by the railway company Lokaltog.

See also
 List of railway stations in Denmark

External links

 Lokaltog

Railway stations opened in 1880
Railway stations in the Capital Region of Denmark
Buildings and structures in Gribskov Municipality
Railway stations in Denmark opened in the 19th century